Møre og Romsdal is a county in the northernmost part of Western Norway. It borders the counties of Trøndelag, Innlandet, and Vestland. The county administration is located in the town of Molde, while Ålesund is the largest town.  The county is governed by the Møre og Romsdal County Municipality which includes an elected county council and a county mayor. The national government is represented by the county governor.

Name

The name Møre og Romsdal was created in 1936. The first element refers to the districts of Nordmøre and Sunnmøre, and the last element refers to Romsdal. Until 1919, the county was called "Romsdalens amt", and from 1919 to 1935 "Møre fylke".

For hundreds of years (1660-1919), the region was called Romsdalen amt, after the Romsdalen valley in the present-day Rauma Municipality.  The Old Norse form of the name was Raumsdalr. The first element is the genitive case of the name Raumr derived from the name of the river Rauma, i.e. "The Dale of Rauma". Raumr may refer to stream or current, or to booming or thundering waterfalls like Sletta waterfall. A purely legendary approach to the name refers to Raum the Old, one of the sons of Nór, the eponymous Saga King of Norway.  Since the majority of the residents of the county lived in the Sunnmøre region, there was some controversy over the name.  In 1919, many of the old county names were changed and this county was renamed Møre fylke.

The name Møre was chosen to represent the region where the majority of the county residents lived. That name is dative of Old Norse: Mǿrr (á Mǿri) and it is probably derived from the word marr referring to something wet like bog (common along the outer coast) or the sea itself. The name is interpreted as "coastland" or "bogland". Møre was originally the name of the coastal area from Stad and north including most of Fosen. (There is also a coastal district in Sweden that has the same name: Möre.)  The change in name from Romsdalen to Møre was controversial and it did not sit well with the residents of the Romsdal region.  Finally in 1936, the name was changed again to a compromise name: Møre og Romsdal.

The ambiguous designation møring— "person from Møre"— is used strictly about people from Nordmøre (and less frequently for people from Sunnmøre), excluding the people from Romsdal (while, consequently, romsdaling— "person from Romsdal"— is used about the latter).

Coat of arms
The coat of arms was granted on 15 March 1978. It shows three gold-colored Viking ships on a blue background. Shipping and shipbuilding were historically very important to the region, so boats were chosen as the symbol of the arms.  The masts on the Viking ships form crosses, which symbolize the strong Christian and religious beliefs as well as the strong religious organisations in the county. There are three boats to represent the three districts of the county: Sunnmøre, Romsdal and Nordmøre.

Geography
Traditionally, the county has been divided into three districts. From north to south, these are Nordmøre, Romsdal, and Sunnmøre. Although the districts do not have separate governments and despite modern road, sea, and air connections throughout the county, the three districts still have their own identities in many ways. Historically speaking, connections have been stronger between Nordmøre and Sør-Trøndelag to the north, Romsdal and Oppland to the east, and Sunnmøre and Sogn og Fjordane to the south, than internally. Differences in dialects between the three districts bear clear evidence of this. Due to geographical features, the county has many populated islands and is intersected by several deep fjords. Due to its difficult terrain, Møre og Romsdal has been very dependent on boat traffic, and its main car ferry company, MRF, has existed since 1921.

Settlements
Møre og Romsdal has six settlements with town status. The largest three (Ålesund, Kristiansund, and Molde) were towns long before 1993 when municipalities were given the legal authority to grant town status rather than just the King (and government).  This change in law led to an increase in the number of towns (Fosnavåg, Åndalsnes, and Ulsteinvik were all added after this time). The county contains many other urban settlements (as defined by Statistics Norway) without town status, every municipality except for Halsa and Smøla contains at least one. As of 1 January 2018, there were 192,331 people (about 72 percent of the population) living in densely populated areas in the county while only 73,946 people lived in sparsely populated areas. The population density is highest near the coast, with all of the county's towns located on saltwater.

The largest town in the county is Ålesund, with a population of 52,626 in the agglomeration which it forms together with parts of Sula.

Municipalities
Møre og Romsdal has a total of 26 municipalities.

Infrastructure
Møre og Romsdal is served by nine airports, of which only the four airports located near the four largest centres have regular domestic flights. The largest airport in the county is Ålesund Airport, Vigra, which offers the only scheduled international routes from any airport in Møre og Romsdal. Ålesund Airport had 732,614 passengers in 2006. Kristiansund Airport, Kvernberget, had 364,350 passengers in 2007, while Molde Airport, Årø, had 401,292, down from 444,677 in 2006. Ørsta–Volda Airport, Hovden, had 49,842 passengers in 2006. None of the airports in Møre og Romsdal offer regular flights to each other.

There is one railway, the Rauma Line, which starts at Åndalsnes and connects to the main railway network of Norway. Public buses are operated by the county, using the brand name Fram.

History
The county (with its current borders) was established in 1671 - but after just four years (in 1675) it was divided into two amts (counties): Romsdal (which included Nordmøre) and Sunnmøre (which included Nordfjord).  In 1680 (only 5 years later), Sunnmøre (including Nordfjord) was merged into Bergenhus amt.  Then in 1689 (another 9 years later), the three regions of Romsdal, Sunnmøre, and Nordmøre were again merged into one amt/county: Romsdalen.  Then in 1701 (another 11 years later) Romsdalen amt was split and divided between Trondhjems amt (which got Romsdal and Nordmøre) and Bergenhus amt (which got Sunnmøre). In 1704 (a mere 4 years later), the three regions of Romsdal, Sunnmøre, and Nordmøre were again merged into one county. The borders of the county have not been changed much since 1704.  The annex parish of Vinje within the larger Hemne parish was transferred from Romsdalens amt to Søndre Trondhjems amt in 1838 (according to the 1838 Formannskapsdistrikt law, a parish could no longer be divided between two counties, so Vinje had to be in the same county as the rest of the parish).  

On 1 January 2019, the municipality of Rindal was transferred from Møre og Romsdal county to the neighboring Trøndelag county.  On 1 January 2020, the municipality of Halsa became part of the new municipality of Heim in Trøndelag county.

In 2019, archaeologists from the Norwegian Institute for Cultural Heritage Research, using large-scale high-resolution radar technology, determined that a 17-meter-long Viking ship was buried on the island of Edøya near Edøy Church. They estimate the ship's age as over 1,000 years: from the Merovingian or Viking period; the group planned to conduct additional searches in the area. A similar burial was found previously by a NIKU team in 2018, in Gjellestad.

Parishes

 Aukra (Akerø)
 Aure
 Austefjord
 Bergmo
 Bjørke
 Bolsøy
 Borgund
 Brattvåg
 Brattvær
 Bremsnes
 Bud (Boe)
 Dalsfjord
 Edøy
 Old Edøy
 Eid
 Eide
 Eikesdal
 Ellingsøy
 Eresfjord
 Fiksdal
 Fjørtoft
 Frei (Fredøe)
 Fræna
 Geiranger
 Giske
 Gjemnes
 Gjøra
 Godøy
 Grip
 Grytten
 Gullstein
 Gursken
 Halsa
 Hamnsund
 Haram
 Hareid
 Harøy
 Hen
 Herøy
 Hildre
 Hjørundfjord
 Hof
 Holm
 Hopen
 Hov
 Hustad
 Ikornnes
 Indre Fræna
 Indre Herøy
 Indre Sula
 Kilsfjord
 Kirkelandet
 Kleive
 Kornstad
 Kors
 Kristiansund
 Kvernes
 Kvernes Stave
 Langevåg
 Larsnes
 Leikanger
 Liabygda
 Mo
 Molde
 Myrbostad
 Nesset
 Nord Aukra
 Nord-Heggdal
 Nordbyen
 Norddal
 Nordlandet
 Otrøy
 Otterøy
 Ranes (Skei)
 Rindal
 Roald
 Romfo
 Rovde
 Røbekk
 Rød
 Rødven
 Rødven Stave
 Røvik
 Saint Jetmund
 Sande
 Sandøy
 Sekken
 Sira Church (Nesset)
 Skarbøvik
 Skei
 Skodje
 Smøla
 Spjelkavik
 Stangvik
 Stemshaug
 Old Stordal
 Stordal
 Stranda
 Straumsnes
 Sunndal
 Sunnylven
 Surnadal (Surendal)
 Sykkylven
 Sylte
 Syvde
 Sør Aukra
 Sør-Tustna
 Tingvoll
 Todalen
 Tresfjord
 Tustna
 Ulstein
 Valderøy
 Valsøyfjord
 Vanylven
 Vartdal
 Vatne
 Vestnes
 Veøy
 Old Veøy
 Vigra
 Vike
 Vistdal
 Volda
 Voll
 Volsdalen
 Vågstranda
 Vågøy
 Ytre Fræna
 Øksendal
 Øre
 Ørskog
 Ørsta
 Øverdalen
 Øvre Rindal
 Øye
 Ålesund
 Ålvundeid
 Åram
 Åsskard
 Kristiansund Branch (LDS, 1904–1923)
 Ålesund Branch (LDS, early-1923)

Villages

 Alnes
 Angvik
 Aukrasanden
 Aure, Aure
 Aure, Sykkylven
 Austnes
 Batnfjordsøra
 Boggestranda
 Brandal
 Brattvåg
 Bremsnes
 Bruhagen
 Bud
 Dravlaus
 Dyrkorn
 Eggesbønes
 Eide
 Eidsbygda
 Eidsdal
 Eidsvik
 Eidsvåg
 Eikesdalen
 Eiksund
 Elnesvågen
 Eresfjord
 Fiksdal
 Fiskåbygd
 Flemma
 Flåskjer
 Fyrde
 Geiranger
 Gjemnes
 Gjøra
 Glærem
 Grip
 Grøa
 Gullstein
 Gursken
 Haddal
 Halsanaustan
 Hareid
 Hausbygda
 Heggem
 Helle
 Hellesylt
 Helsem
 Hjelset
 Hjørungavåg
 Hoelsand
 Hoffland
 Hollingen
 Hopen
 Hovland
 Hustad
 Ikornnes
 Innfjorden
 Isfjorden
 Jordalsgrenda
 Kleive
 Kornstad
 Kvalsund
 Kvernes
 Kårvåg
 Langevåg
 Larsnes
 Langøy
 Leikong
 Leira
 Leitebakk
 Liabygda
 Liabøen
 Longva
 Løvika
 Malme
 Malmefjorden
 Mauseidvåg
 Midsund
 Mittet
 Mo
 Myklebost, Sandøy
 Myklebost, Vanylven
 Myklebostad
 Myklebost
 Måndalen
 Nedre Frei
 Nesjestranda
 Nord-Heggdal
 Norddal
 Nordstrand
 Ona
 Rausand
 Rensvik
 Roald
 Romfo
 Rovdane
 Råket
 Røbekk
 Rødven
 Røssøyvågen
 Røvika
 Sande
 Sjøholt
 Skei
 Skodje
 Slagnes
 Spjelkavik
 Stangvik
 Steinshamn
 Stemshaug
 Stordal
 Store Standal
 Stranda
 Straumgjerde
 Straumshamn
 Sunndalsøra
 Surnadalsøra
 Sylte, Fræna
 Sylte, Norddal
 Sylte, Surnadal
 Syvde
 Sølsnes
 Søvik
 Sæbø
 Sætre
 Tafjord
 Tennfjord
 Tingvollvågen
 Todalen
 Todalsøra
 Tomrefjord
 Tornes
 Torvikbukt
 Tresfjord
 Tusvik
 Tømmervåg
 Valle
 Valsøybotnen
 Valsøyfjord
 Varhaugvika
 Vatne
 Veblungsnes
 Veiholmen
 Verma
 Vestnes
 Vevang
 Vik
 Vikebukt
 Visnes
 Vistdal
 Volda
 Voll
 Vågstranda
 Øksendalsøra
 Øre
 Ørsta
 Åfarnes
 Åheim
 Ålvund
 Ålvundeidet
 Åram
 Årset
 Åsskard

Former Municipalities

 Bolsøy
 Borgund
 Brattvær
 Bremsnes
 Bud
 Dalsfjord
 Edøy
 Eid
 Eid og Voll
 Eide
 Eresfjord og Vistdal
 Frei
 Fræna
 Grip
 Grytten
 Halsa
 Haram
 Hen
 Hjørundfjord
 Hopen
 Hustad
 Kornstad
 Kvernes
 Midsund
 Nesset
 Norddal
 Rovde
 Sandøy
 Skodje
 Stangvik
 Stemshaug
 Stordal
 Straumsnes
 Sunnylven
 Syvde
 Sør-Aukra
 Tresfjord
 Tustna
 Valsøyfjord
 Vartdal
 Vatne
 Veøy
 Vigra
 Voll
 Øksendal
 Øre
 Ørskog
 Ålvundeid
 Åsskard

See also
Augustinius Neldal Lossius

References

External links
 Møre og Romsdal county
 
 

 
Counties of Norway
Orkneyinga saga places
1662 establishments in Norway